The Chief of the Serbian Armed Forces General Staff is the principal head of the Serbian Armed Forces. The Chief of the Serbian General Staff is appointed by the President of Serbia, who is the commander-in-chief. 

The incumbent Chief of the General Staff is General Milan Mojsilović. He was appointed by President Aleksandar Vučić on 14 September 2018.

The Deputy Chief of the General Staff is simultaneously the Joint Operations Commander in peacetime. The incumbent Joint Operations Commander is Lt. Col. General Petar Cvetković.

Chiefs of the General Staff (1876–1918)

|-
! colspan=8| 

|-
! colspan=8| 

For period from 1918 to 2006, see Chief of the General Staff of Yugoslavia.

Chiefs of the General Staff (2006–present)

Timeline

Notes

References

Sources
 Chief of the General Staff: 1876–2000, Ivetić Velimir, Belgrade 2000.

Military of Serbia
 
Serbia
Chief of the General Staff